Burnett Wedlake "Burn" Bullock (5 October 1896 – 22 December 1954) was an English first-class cricketer who played for Surrey in a few matches between 1922 and 1924. He was born in Redhill, Surrey and died in Balham, London.

Bullock was the son of the surveyor for the town council of Mitcham, and was long associated with the Mitcham Cricket Club. He was described as a draughtsman when he joined the Royal Flying Corps in November 1915 and then the Royal Air Force in 1918 when it was formed. His trade was a Rigger Aero until he was discharged in 1919.

Bullock began playing cricket fairly regularly for Surrey's second eleven from 1920, and made his first-class cricket debut that year in a match for a "Gentlemen of the South" team in a game for the benefit of the "pavilion attendant" at The Oval; he neither batted nor bowled in a rain-ruined match. From 1922 to 1924, he played in five matches for the Surrey first team as an opening or middle-order batsman. He played as an amateur, and his highest first-class score was an innings of 40 in his first Surrey game, against Scotland in 1922. He did not play first-class cricket after 1924 and his last game for Surrey's second eleven was in 1925. In 1926 and 1927, he was employed as a cricket coach to the South Norfolk Cricket Club.

Returning to the London area, in 1939 Bullock was a licensed victualler at the Regent Arms in Westminster. He later became the licensee at the King's Head, an old coaching inn next to Mitcham Cricket Green and the cricket club pavilion, and after his death in 1954 the inn, which is a Grade II listed building, was renamed the "Burn Bullock" in his honour: as of 2017, it is currently closed.

References

1896 births
1954 deaths
English cricketers
Surrey cricketers
Royal Flying Corps soldiers
Royal Air Force airmen
British publicans
Royal Air Force personnel of World War I
Gentlemen of the South cricketers
20th-century British businesspeople